Comita II (or III) (died 1147) was the Judge of the Judicate of Arborea, from 1131 until his death. He was the son of Constantine I of Arborea, first ruler of Arborea of the Lacon dynasty.  He married Elena de Orrubu, mother of Barison II of Arborea. The dating and chronology of his reign are obscure.

Comita succeeded his father Constantine I of Arborea. The date of this succession is assumed to be 1131, when he first appears in a communication with the Republic of Genoa. In 1130, Constantine, Gonario II of Torres, and Comita I of Gallura had sworn fealty to the archbishop of Pisa. In 1133, Pope Innocent II raised Genoa to archiepiscopal status and divided the island of Sardinia between the two sees, giving the north to Genoa and the south to Pisa. In the subsequent wars of that decade, Comita was the sole ally of the Genoese.

From 1133 to 1145, there is a gap in the testimony referring to Comita and it is possible that his brother Torbeno successfully usurped his throne during a war with the Judicate of Logudoro. In 1145, Comita was back in power and was excommunicated by Baldwin, Archbishop of Pisa. The Pisan prelate, travelling the island as a papal legate, had excommunicated the judge for oppressing the people and warring against Pisa. Bernard of Clairvaux even weighed into island politics and sent a letter to Pope Eugene III to justify Baldwin's actions. Nominally Arborea was transferred to Logudoro. Comita died soon after.

Notes

Sources
Caravale, Mario (ed). Dizionario Biografico degli Italiani: XXVII Collenuccio – Confortini. Rome, 1982.
Scano, D. "Serie cronol. dei giudici sardi." Arch. stor. sardo. 1939.
Besta, E. and Somi, A. I condaghi di San Nicolas di Trullas e di Santa Maria di Bonarcado. Milan, 1937.

1147 deaths
People excommunicated by the Catholic Church
Judges (judikes) of Arborea
12th-century Italian nobility
Year of birth missing